Lambros Athanassoulas (born November 10, 1976, in Athens) is a Greek rally driver.

Career
Athanassoulas graduated from the American College of Greece and got a BEng in Mechanical Engineering and an M.A. in Finance from the University of Westminster. He started racing in 2001, after winning a competition by Greek magazine 4 Wheels and Toyota Hellas. This earned him the chance to drive a Toyota Yaris rally car. In 2005 he won the A5 class of the Greek Rally Championship driving a Ford Puma Kit Car. This led to him becoming an official driver for Ford Motor Hellas. This included making his World Rally Championship debut in a Ford Fiesta S1600 at the 2005 Acropolis Rally. In 2006 Athanassoulas competed in the Fiesta Sporting Trophy, as part of the WRC. In 2007 and 2008 he competed at his home event of the WRC in a Group N Subaru Impreza. For the 2009 Acropolis Rally, Athanassoulas competed in a Škoda Fabia S2000, winning the PWRC class and finishing eighth overall. He followed this by winning his class on the 2009 Rally Catalunya on the debut of the new Ford Fiesta R2. He was named Greek Athlete of the Year at the end of 2009 by Status magazine.
Athanssoulas' first start in the highest class was the 2011 Acropolis Rally, when he presented strong pace, but due to retirement on the first leg and returning later under Rally2 rules classified only 19th. He returned to rallying in 2015 with the Skoda Fabia R5 and scored 3rd place in that year's Acropolis Rally, losing only to title contestants Kajetan Kajetanowicz and Craig Breen, he also led the rally at one point. In 2016, he took on the Rallye Monte-Carlo and finished 22nd overall, 8th in the WRC-2 class. Later that year, he contested both of the local ERC events - the 2016 Acropolis Rally, which he finished in second place (only behind the season's runner-up Ralfs Sirmacis)  and the 2016 Cyprus Rally.
After a long break, Athanassoulas returned once again in 2021. During the revived Acropolis Rally, Athanassoulas drove the Hyundai i20 N Rally2 and therefore became the first customer entry to use the car in World Rally Championship. However, the new car didn't bring him much luck, as he retired on SS3, but returned later. He scored 6th on the power stage, but after Yohan Rossel's disqualification advanced up to power stage place, which allowed him to score 1 point and classify in WRC-3 standings.

WRC results

PWRC results

References

External links
 Athanassoulas Rally Team
 Profile at eWRC-results.com

1976 births
Greek rally drivers
Living people
World Rally Championship drivers
Sportspeople from Athens